The Grand Order of King Petar Krešimir IV, or more fully the Grand Order of King Petar Krešimir IV with sash and Morning Star (Velered kralja Petra Krešimira IV. s lentom i Danicom), is an order of the Republic of Croatia. It ranks third in the Croatian order of precedence after the Grand Order of Queen Jelena. The next order in rank is the Grand Order of King Dmitar Zvonimir. The order had been established on June 20, 1992 and reconstituted on April 1, 1995.

Only highly ranked state officials, foreign officials, and senior military officials are eligible for this order.

It is named after King Peter Krešimir IV of Croatia.

Recipients

Foreign officials 
 Mark Dayton
 Roland Ertl
 Jaap de Hoop Scheffer
 George Robertson

Croatian dignitaries 

Janko Bobetko
Zvonimir Červenko
Žarko Domljan
Franjo Gregurić
Josip Lucić
Zlatko Mateša
Nedjeljko Mihanović
Vlatko Pavletić
Hrvoje Šarinić
Vladimir Šeks
Martin Špegelj
Petar Stipetić
Gojko Šušak
Anton Tus
Nikica Valentić

References

Orders, decorations, and medals of Croatia
Awards established in 1992
1992 establishments in Croatia